Stoycho Zahariev Stoev (born 15 July 1962) is a Bulgarian former footballer and manager.

Manager career
On 23 July 2013, Bulgaria champions Ludogorets Razgrad replaced coach Ivaylo Petev with Stoycho Stoev, following a 1–0 defeat by Lyubimets on the opening day of the new season.

In the 2013–14 UEFA Europa League he managed Ludogorets to win their group and proceed to the round of 32. After a surprising 1-0 loss against Haskovo Stoev was released by the club. On 22 December 2014 Stoycho Stoev took charge of Levski Sofia. On 13 May 2016, after a meeting with the board of directors, it was announced that Stoev had been released by the club.

On 26 August 2018 he was appointed as manager of Arda Kardzhali. In early March 2019, Stoev once again became head coach of Ludogorets Razgrad, taking over from Antoni Zdravkov. On 25 August 2019, Stoev was fired once again from the club following a 0:0 home draw with Slavia Sofia.

Manager

Statistics

Honours

Player honours
Lokomotiv Sofia
 Bulgarian Cup (1): 1982

Managerial honours
Ludogorets Razgrad
 Bulgarian A Group (2): 2013–14, 2018–19
 Bulgarian Cup (1): 2013–14
 Bulgarian Supercup (1): 2019
 Manager of the year in the A PFG - 2013
 3rd place in the coach (for all sports) in Bulgaria rankings - 2013

References

External links

 Profile at LevskiSofia.info

1962 births
Living people
People from Razgrad
Bulgarian footballers
Bulgarian football managers
Bulgarian expatriate footballers
Bulgaria international footballers
FC Lokomotiv 1929 Sofia players
Panserraikos F.C. players
FC Montana managers
PFC Ludogorets Razgrad managers
PFC Levski Sofia managers
First Professional Football League (Bulgaria) players
Expatriate footballers in Greece
Bulgarian expatriate sportspeople in Greece
Association football forwards